Stirling is a historic mansion located at Reading, Berks County, Pennsylvania.  It was built between 1890 and 1892, and is a three-story, 24-room, Châteauesque style dwelling.  It was designed by noted Philadelphia architect Theophilus Parsons Chandler, Jr. (1845-1928) and built for industrialist James Hervey Sternbergh.  It is constructed of squared granite ashlar and features a number of eclectic decorative elements including tall chimneys with decorated caps, a balustraded verandah, steeply pitched gable roofs, and roof dormers.  It is now occupied by a bed and breakfast.

It was listed on the National Register of Historic Places in 1980.

References

Buildings and structures in Reading, Pennsylvania
Bed and breakfasts in Pennsylvania
Houses on the National Register of Historic Places in Pennsylvania
Houses completed in 1892
Houses in Berks County, Pennsylvania
National Register of Historic Places in Reading, Pennsylvania